The Japan 2022 FIFA World Cup bid was the second official bid from the Japan Football Association or the JFA. Had this bid been successful (the bid was won by Qatar), Japan would have been hosting their second World Cup Finals and it would have been their first solo hosting since they shared the 2002 FIFA World Cup with other co-host South Korea, becoming the sixth nation to host the tournament twice, after Italy, France, Mexico, Brazil and (West) Germany. On May 4, 2010, the Japanese Football Association Bid team decided to concentrate solely on winning the right to host the 2022 FIFA World Cup.

Schedule

Candidate venues
12 stadiums are proposed. 

a: Stadium/site used in 2002 FIFA World Cup

3D and holographic simulcasts
Japan pledged that if it had been granted the rights to host the 2022 World Cup games, it would develop technology enabling it to provide a live international telecast of the event in 3D, which would allow 400 stadiums in 208 countries to provide 360 million people with real-time 3D coverage of the games projected on giant screens, captured in 360 degrees by 200 HD cameras. Furthermore, Japan will broadcast the games in holographic format if the technology to do so is available by that time.  Beyond allowing the world's spectators to view the games on flat screens projecting 3D imaging, holographic projection would project the games onto stadium fields, creating a greater illusion of actually being in the presence of the players.  Microphones embedded below the playing surface would record all sounds, such as ball kicks, in order to add to the sense of realism.

Japan's bidding team has enlisted pioneering technology scientist Jun Murai of Keio University in their plans to host the games.  The country demonstrated holographic display technology at the 2009 NAB Show using integral cameras (sometimes referred to as 8K) and wavefront reconstruction, and Murai has stated that Japan could develop the means for the necessary technologies to be realized by 2016.  Murai and committee managing director Takato Maruyama have stated they are confident that the endeavor is feasible.  The event would be co-organized with South Korea.

In addition to projection, "translation earpieces" would be available to allow fans of different nations to converse with each other. Devices would also be available which would allow people to instantly capture information about players by pointing at them.

Power sources
The events would be powered in part by attendees, via equipment that would harvest energy created by their footsteps. It would also obtain energy from solar panels.

Industry ramifications
If Japan had been awarded the 2022 World Cup, providing it with the initiative to realize the proposed technologies, it could drive private companies to develop them as well, in order to stay in competition in the industry, resulting in accelerated development of the medium. Maruyama expressed his belief that with the advent of such technologies, public viewings at stadiums would increase attendance there by several ten-fold.

Official bid partners
 Adidas
 Asahi Shimbun
 Fuji Television
 Japan Airlines
 JTB Global Marketing & Travel
 Kinki Nippon Tourist
 Kirin Brewery Company
 Nikkei Inc.
 Nintendo 
 Nippon Television
 Nishitetsu Travel
 Nisshin OilliO Group
 Pia Corp.
 Sankei Shimbun
 Sony
 SKY Perfect JSAT Corporation
 Tokyo Broadcasting System
 Toppan Printing
 TV Asahi
 TV Tokyo
 Uniqlo

References

External links
Official bid homepage
Official YouTube channel

Japan
Football in Japan
Japan at the 2022 FIFA World Cup